Perilampsis diademata is a species of tephritid or fruit flies in the genus Perilampsis of the family Tephritidae.

References

diademata